Judy May Foote  ( Crowley; born June 23, 1952) is a Canadian former politician, 14th and current lieutenant governor of Newfoundland and Labrador. She is the first woman to hold the position.

Prior to her appointment as viceregal representative of the King in Right of Newfoundland and Labrador, Foote was the Liberal Member of Parliament for the ridings of Bonavista—Burin—Trinity (2015–2017) and Random—Burin—St. George's (2008–2015). She was the federal Minister of Public Services and Procurement from 2015 until her resignation from cabinet and Parliament for family reasons on August 24, 2017.

Early life 
Foote was born on June 23, 1952, in Grand Bank, Newfoundland and Labrador. She was the head of the university relations division of the Memorial University of Newfoundland before she entered politics.

Political career
Foote served as the communications director for premier Clyde Wells before she ran for an elected position.

She ran in the 1993 provincial election in Grand Bank but lost to PC incumbent Bill Matthews.

Foote represented the electoral district of Grand Bank in the Newfoundland and Labrador House of Assembly from 1996 to 2007 as a member of the Liberal Party.

She served in the provincial cabinet as Minister of Development and Rural Renewal from 1996 to 1997, as Minister of Industry, Trade and Technology from 1997 to 1998, as Minister of Education from 1998 to 2000 and from 2001 to 2003. In February 2003, Foote became Newfoundland's Minister of Industry, Trade and Rural Development in a cabinet shuffle. Foote was narrowly reelected by 43 votes after a recount reduced her initial 50-vote lead in the Newfoundland and Labrador general election in October 2003.

In 2007, Foote stepped down from the House of Assembly after she won the Liberal party nomination for Random—Burin—St. George's against former Newfoundland cabinet minister Oliver Langdon and businessman Roger Jamieson to run in the 2008 federal election. Foote was then elected to the House of Commons of Canada in 2008, succeeding longtime Liberal MP Bill Matthews. In 2009, Foote, along with the other five Liberal MPs from Newfoundland, voted against the 2009 Canadian federal budget because it went against funding promises made to the province in the 1985 Atlantic Accord.

Foote became the Liberal Deputy House Leader in September 2010, but after she was reelected in the 2011 federal election, she accepted the position of Liberal Whip, which she held until the 2015 federal election.

Minister of Public Services and Procurement
Upon the Liberal victory in 2015, she joined the cabinet as Minister of Public Services and Procurement. She received the highest percentage of votes of any candidate nationwide in the 2015 election winning her seat with nearly 82% of all votes. In the House of Commons, Foote was seated next to Justin Trudeau during the Liberal Party's time in Government until her resignation.

In May 2016, Foote appeared alongside premier Dwight Ball to announce that $250 million will be loaned to the provincial government from the federal government to reduce controversial taxes proposed in the provincial budget and Foote also said that more federal help for the province is coming in the future.

Foote was the minister responsible for overseeing the roll-out of the Phoenix pay system in 2016.  That system has had serious problems with underpayments and over payments, and the opposition NDP have suggested that Foote take more responsibility for the problems.

On August 24, 2017, following a leave of absence for personal reasons since April 2017, Foote announced she was resigning from the federal cabinet and her seat as an MP because she had learned that she carries the BRCA2 cancer-causing gene and that she had passed it on to her children. However, she said that she was cancer-free at the time and her children were "well."

Lieutenant Governor
On March 20, 2018, Prime Minister Justin Trudeau announced the appointment of Foote to succeed Frank Fagan as the Lieutenant Governor of Newfoundland and Labrador. She is the first woman to be appointed as the viceregal representative for the province. Foote was sworn in on May 3, 2018.

Personal life
In 2000, Foote was diagnosed with breast cancer while serving as a provincial Member of the House of Assembly for the District of Grand Bank and underwent procedures and treatments. In June 2014, Foote announced that she was battling breast cancer for the second time.

Electoral record

|-

|-

|-

|NDP
|Bill Wakeley
|align="right"|136
|align="right"|2.15%
|align="right"|
|}

|-

|-

|-

|NDP
|Richard Rennie
|align="right"|538
|align="right"|
|align="right"|
|}

|}

 
|NDP
|Joseph L. Edwards
|align="right"|181
|align="right"|
|align="right"|
|-
|}

Titles, styles, honours, and arms

Titles
 November 4, 2015 – May 3, 2018: The Honourable Judy Foote 
 May 3, 2018 – present: Her Honour the Honourable Judy Foote, Lieutenant Governor of Newfoundland and Labrador 

As Lieutenant Governor, Foote is entitled to be styled Her Honour while in office and The Honourable for life. Prior to her appointment Foote was already entitled to the style The Honourable for life as a member of the King's Privy Council for Canada.

Honours

Appointments
  November 4, 2015: Member of the Queen's Privy Council for Canada (PC)
  May 3, 2018: Member of the Order of Newfoundland and Labrador (ONL)
 May 3, 2018 – present: Chancellor of the Order of Newfoundland and Labrador (while in office)
  3 May 2018: Dame of Justice of the Most Venerable Order of the Hospital of Saint John of Jerusalem (D.StJ) (Vice-Prior in Newfoundland and Labrador while in office)

Medals
  2002: Queen Elizabeth II Golden Jubilee Medal
  2012: Queen Elizabeth II Diamond Jubilee Medal

Honorary military appointments
  3 May 2018Present: Honorary Colonel of the Royal Newfoundland Regiment.
  3 May 2018Present: Patron of the Canadian Corps of Commissionaires (Newfoundland and Labrador Branch).
  3 May 2018Present: Honorary Chief of Police of the Royal Newfoundland Constabulary.

Arms 
Foote was granted a coat of arms by the Canadian Heraldic Authority through Grant of Arms and Supporters, with differences to Carla Jean Foote, Jason Howard Foote and Heidi Ellen Lee Foote, on May 15, 2019.

References

External links

1952 births
Women members of the House of Commons of Canada
Liberal Party of Canada MPs
Living people
Members of the House of Commons of Canada from Newfoundland and Labrador
Members of the United Church of Canada
Liberal Party of Newfoundland and Labrador MHAs
Women MHAs in Newfoundland and Labrador
People from Grand Bank
Members of the King's Privy Council for Canada
Members of the Executive Council of Newfoundland and Labrador
Members of the 29th Canadian Ministry
Women government ministers of Canada
21st-century Canadian women politicians
Memorial University of Newfoundland alumni
Lieutenant Governors of Newfoundland and Labrador
Canadian women viceroys
Members of the Order of Newfoundland and Labrador
Royal Newfoundland Regiment officers